The Postmodernism Generator is a computer program that automatically produces "close imitations" of postmodernist writing. It was written in 1996 by Andrew C. Bulhak of Monash University using the Dada Engine, a system for generating random text from recursive grammars. A free version is also hosted online. The essays are produced from a formal grammar defined by a recursive transition network.

Responses

It was mentioned by biologist Richard Dawkins in the conclusion to his article "Postmodernism Disrobed" (1998) for the scientific journal Nature, reprinted in his book A Devil's Chaplain (2004).

After he "produced the first two [lines] using a 'Postmodernism Generator,' and the second two using an 'Analytic Philosophy Generator'", philosophy of information and information ethics researcher Luciano Floridi stated that

See also 
 Academese
 Parody generator
 Paper generator
 SCIgen
 Sokal affair
Monte Carlo method

References

External links 
 The Postmodernism Generator web page (generates a random postmodernist article each time loaded)
 snarXiv
 Chomskybot (a similar program from the 80's based on a small corpus of Analytic philosopher Noam Chomsky's texts )
 Analytic Philosophy Generator

Criticism of postmodernism
Postmodernism
Natural language generation
Computer-related introductions in 1996